Huozhou, formerly Huo County or Huoxian, is a county-level city in Linfen, in southern Shanxi Province, China. The city spans an area or 765 square kilometers, and has a population of 155,000 as of 2017.

Administrative divisions 
Huozhou has jurisdiction over five subdistricts, four towns and three townships.

The city's administrative offices are located in Kaiyuan Subdistrict.

Geography 
The Fen River runs through the city from north to south.

Climate 

History 
Present-day Huozhou was once part of the Ji Province of ancient China, when it was simply named Huo. During the Spring and Autumn Period of Chinese history, the city was conquered by Duke Xian of Jin in 661 BCE, and was subsequently renamed Huoyi. During the Yuan Dynasty, the area received its current name, Huozhou.

During the Ming dynasty, the city was made a fief for second rank princely peerages.

Economy 
Major agricultural products produced in Huozhou include wheat, corn, millet, soybeans, potatoes, apples, walnuts, cotton, sunflower oil, rapeseed, and various vegetables.

Huozhou's mineral deposits include iron, copper, aluminum, gold, limestone, dolomite, gypsum, refractory clay, phosphorus, sillimanite, kaolinite, pegmatite, quartz sand, barite, graphite, granite, Yixing clay, pyrite, other types of clay, sand and gravel, rare earth minerals, energy mineral coal, mineral water. As of 2011, the city's coal reserves total 1.735 billion tons, and quartz sand reserves totalled 170 million tons.

Transport 
The southern portion of the Datong–Puzhou railway and the G5 Beijing-Kunming Expressway both run through the city.

References

Cities in Shanxi
County-level divisions of Shanxi